HD 197027 (HIP 102152) is a star in the constellation Capricornus. It has an apparent magnitude of 9.15, making it readily visible through a telescope but not to the naked eye.

HD 197027 has a stellar classification of G3 V, indicating that it is an ordinary G-type main-sequence star like the Sun. It has only 97% the mass of the Sun but 108% of its radius. It shines at 119% the luminosity of the Sun from its photosphere at an effective temperature of 5,718 K, similar to the Sun's 5,778 K. HD 197027's metallicity – elements heavier than helium – is similar to the Sun.

Since its measured properties of this star are very similar to those of the Sun, it has been considered a candidate older solar twin. The abundances of 21 elements overall are more similar to the Sun than any other known solar twin.  A

Age

References

External links 
Oldest Solar Twin Identified
HIGH PRECISION ABUNDANCES OF THE OLD SOLAR TWIN HIP 102152: INSIGHTS ON LI DEPLETION FROM THE OLDEST SUN
Oldest Solar Twin Identified

Capricornus (constellation)
Solar analogs
G-type main-sequence stars
Durchmusterung objects
197027
102152